Ali Osseiran is former Lebanese government minister and a member of the Parliament of Lebanon. He represents the Zahrani district of South Lebanon. He is the son of Lebanese politician Adel Osseiran. Osseiran served as the minister of state in the first cabinet of Rafik Hariri between 31 October 1992 and 25 May 1995.

See also
 Sheikh Mohamad Osseiran

References

External links
 The Parliament of Lebanon: MP Ali Adel Osseiran

1947 births
Living people
Members of the Parliament of Lebanon
Lebanese Shia Muslims
Osseiran family 
Ministers without portfolio of Lebanon